Alfred Hitchcock Presents, sometimes called The New Alfred Hitchcock Presents, is an American anthology series that aired on NBC from 1985 to 1986 and on the USA Network from 1987 to 1989. The series is an updated version of the 1955 eponymous series.

The series aired 76 episodes.

Background 

In 1985, NBC aired a new made-for-television film based upon the series, combining newly filmed stories with colorized footage of Alfred Hitchcock from the original series introducing each segment. The segments were "Incident in a Small Jail," adapted and directed by Joel Oliansky, "Man from the South," adapted and directed by Steve De Jarnatt, "Bang! You're Dead!," adapted by Harold Swanton and Christopher Crowe and directed by Randa Haines, and "An Unlocked Window," adapted and directed by Fred Walton. The film was a ratings success.

Format 

A new Alfred Hitchcock Presents series debuted in the fall of 1985 and retained the same format as the film – newly filmed stories (a mixture of original works and updated remakes of original series episodes) with colorized introductions by Hitchcock. The new series lasted only one season before NBC cancelled it, but it was then produced for three more years by USA Network (which is now co-owned with NBC under NBCUniversal), and shifted production from Los Angeles to Toronto, where the show's new Canadian producing partner Paragon Motion Pictures was based. Name directors who helmed episodes included Tim Burton, David Chase, Burt Reynolds, Atom Egoyan, Joan Tewkesbury, and Thomas Carter.

Episodes

Notable guest stars

Series pilot 

 Ned Beatty as Larry Broome (segment "Incident in a Small Jail")
 Lee Ving as Curt Venner (segment "Incident in a Small Jail")
 Tony Frank as Sheriff Noakes (segment "Incident in a Small Jail")
 John Huston as Carlos/Narrator (segment "Man from the South")
 Melanie Griffith as Girl (segment "Man from the South")
 Annette O'Toole as Stella (segment "An Unlocked Window")
 Bruce Davison as Betty Ames/Baker (segment "An Unlocked Window")
 Richard Lineback as Billy (segment "Incident In A Small Jail")
 Steven Bauer as Gambler (Segment "Man From The South")
 Tippi Hedren as Waitress (Segment "Man From The South")
 Kim Novak as Rosa (Segment "Man From The South")
 Lyman Ward as Uncle Jack (Segment "Bang! You're Dead!")
 Bill Mumy as Supermarket Clerk (Segment "Bang! You're Dead!")
 Jonathan Goldsmith as Manager (Segment "Bang! You're Dead!")
 Helena Kallianiotes as Maria Kyprianov (Segment "An Unlocked Window")

Other episodes

References

External links 

 
 
 The New Alfred Hitchcock Presents episode guide at Garn's Guides

1985 American television series debuts
1989 American television series endings
1980s American mystery television series
1980s American crime television series
English-language television shows
NBC original programming
Television series by Universal Television
Television shows filmed in Toronto
Television series reboots
USA Network original programming
1980s American anthology television series